Wellington Pereira do Nascimento (born 22 April 1984), known as Wellington Paulista, is a Brazilian footballer who plays as a forward for América Mineiro.

Career
Born in São Paulo, he started as a youth team player with Juventus-SP. He gained experience while on loan to Mirassol, Paraná and Santos, where he scored nine goals in 30 games. This performance brought him to the attention of the Spanish Second Division club Deportivo Alavés. Moving to Spain in 2006, he remained with Alavés until December 2007, when he returned to his home country to sign with Botafogo. Paulista scored seven league goals in 28 appearances and was part of the Botafogo side that won the Rio Cup.

Cruzeiro
He signed a contract with Cruzeiro in 2009, and in the same year, scored 21 times in 38 appearances to help Cruzeiro finish fourth in Serie A and win the 2009 Minas Gerais State League. Five of his goals came in the Copa Libertadores, with Cruzeiro reaching the final, where they were beaten by Estudiantes. His haul of 10 goals in 30 appearances in 2010 helped Cruzeiro finish second in Serie A and reach the quarterfinals of Copa Libertadores. Loaned to Palmeiras in 2011, Paulista returned to Cruzeiro in 2012, scoring 28 goals in 40 appearances in all competitions before leaving for West Ham United on loan in 2013.

West Ham United
On 11 January 2013, he signed a six-month loan deal with West Ham United with an option for a further three years, becoming West Ham's fourth signing of the winter 2012–13 transfer window (following Joe Cole, Marouane Chamakh and Sean Maguire). About his move, Paulista said "I think I can do my best here and I am coming to England to prove to everyone that I am one of the best strikers in Brazil and to get better and better". Paulista was a named substitute for two of West Ham's games, against Southampton and Reading, but left the club without having made a first team appearance.

Return to Brazil: Criciúma and Internacional
Wellington Paulista came to Criciúma after leaving England. After this, he signed with the Brazilian football team Internacional, being announced as their new player on 26 December 2013, after rescinding with Cruzeiro.

Fortaleza
In March 2019, he signed a two-year contract with Fortaleza.

Honours
Botafogo
Campeonato Carioca: 2008

Cruzeiro
Campeonato Mineiro: 2009, 2011

Internacional
Campeonato Gaúcho: 2014

Chapecoense
Campeonato Catarinense: 2017

Fortaleza
Campeonato Cearense: 2019, 2020, 2021
Copa do Nordeste: 2019

References

External links

Wellington Paulista

1984 births
Living people
Brazilian footballers
Clube Atlético Juventus players
Mirassol Futebol Clube players
Paraná Clube players
Santos FC players
Deportivo Alavés players
Botafogo de Futebol e Regatas players
Expatriate footballers in Spain
Cruzeiro Esporte Clube players
Sociedade Esportiva Palmeiras players
West Ham United F.C. players
Criciúma Esporte Clube players
Sport Club Internacional players
Coritiba Foot Ball Club players
Fluminense FC players
Fortaleza Esporte Clube players
América Futebol Clube (MG) players
Campeonato Brasileiro Série A players
Associação Atlética Ponte Preta players
Associação Chapecoense de Futebol players
Segunda División players
Footballers from São Paulo
Expatriate footballers in England
Association football forwards